Paul McGuinness (born 2 March 1966) is an English former footballer who played as a midfielder in the Football League for Crewe Alexandra and Chester City. He is the current Head of Academy Player Development for Leicester City's under-18 team.

McGuinness is the son of former Manchester United player and manager Wilf McGuinness, and holds a degree in physical education from Loughborough University.

As a player, McGuinness was a midfielder who made 20 Football League appearances with Crewe Alexandra  and Chester City. He also spent time with Manchester United (where he progressed through the youth ranks) and Bury without appearing in league games for them.

References

1966 births
Living people
Footballers from Manchester
English footballers
Association football midfielders
English Football League players
Manchester United F.C. players
Crewe Alexandra F.C. players
Bury F.C. players
Chester City F.C. players
Manchester United F.C. non-playing staff
Leicester City F.C. non-playing staff 
Sports scientists
People educated at Altrincham Grammar School for Boys
Alumni of Loughborough University
Loughborough University F.C. players